Kepler-44, formerly known as KOI-204,  is a star in the northern constellation of Cygnus. It is located at the celestial coordinates: Right Ascension , Declination . With an apparent visual magnitude of 16, this star is too faint to be seen with the naked eye.

Planetary system
The Kepler spacecraft detected a transiting planet candidate around this star that was confirmed by radial velocity measurements taken by the SOPHIE spectrograph mounted on the 1.93 m telescope at the Haute-Provence Observatory.
The planet is likely to be tidally locked to the parent star. In 2015, the planetary nightside temperature was estimated to be equal to 2347 K.

References

Cygnus (constellation)
G-type main-sequence stars
204
Planetary transit variables
Planetary systems with one confirmed planet